STK Muangnont Football Club, is a Thai professional football club based in Ayutthaya. The club was founded in 2012 as Kopoon Warrior. The club has token over and renamed to Bankunmae in 2019. The club is currently playing in the Thai League 3 Bangkok metropolitan region.

Crest history

Stadium and locations

Season by season record

References

 Kopoon Warrior news
 https://www.youtube.com/watch?v=_Au5AJ7V_Ys
 http://www.thailive.net/2017/05/08/%E0%B9%80%E0%B8%81%E0%B9%8B%E0%B8%B2%E0%B8%9E%E0%B8%AD%E0%B8%A1%E0%B8%B1%E0%B9%89%E0%B8%A2%E0%B9%82%E0%B8%84%E0%B8%9B%E0%B8%B9%E0%B8%99%E0%B9%80%E0%B8%8B%E0%B8%AD%E0%B8%A3%E0%B9%8C%E0%B9%84%E0%B8%9E/
 Kopoon Warrior change its name after pass to T4 league

External links
 

Association football clubs established in 2012
Football clubs in Thailand
Sport in Bangkok
2012 establishments in Thailand